Peter John McKay (born 12 October 1994 in Burton-upon-Trent) is an English cricketer who played for Warwickshire between 2013 and 2015. He is a left-handed batsman who also plays as a wicket-keeper. McKay made his first-class debut for Warwickshire against Oxford MCCU in April 2013.

References

External links
 
 

1994 births
Living people
English cricketers
Warwickshire cricketers
Sportspeople from Burton upon Trent
Wicket-keepers